Rački Vrh is a settlement in the hills west of Hrastje in the Municipality of Radenci in northeastern Slovenia.

References

External links
Rački Vrh on Geopedia

Populated places in the Municipality of Radenci